Mexico competed at the 2017 World Aquatics Championships in Budapest, Hungary from 14 July to 30 July.

Medalists

Diving

Mexico entered 16 divers (nine male and seven female).

Men

Women

Mixed

High diving

Mexico qualified two male and one female high divers.

Open water swimming

Mexico has entered six open water swimmers

Swimming

Mexican swimmers have achieved qualifying standards in the following events (up to a maximum of 2 swimmers in each event at the A-standard entry time, and 1 at the B-standard):

Men

Women

Mixed

Synchronized swimming

Mexico's synchronized swimming team consisted of 12 athletes (12 female).

Women

 Legend: (R) = Reserve Athlete

References

Nations at the 2017 World Aquatics Championships
Mexico at the World Aquatics Championships
2017 in Mexican sports